Mukhayriq was a rabbi who lived in Medina and fought alongside Muhammad in the Battle of Uhud on March 19, 625 (3 Shawwal 3 AH in the Islamic calendar) at the valley located in front of Mount Uhud, in what is now northwestern Arabia.

Story
Mukhayriq was a wealthy, well learned and well respected rabbi, and a leader of the Jewish Arab tribe of Tha'labah.  Tha'labah was a notable tribe of Jews in Medina, who may have been Arabs who adopted Judaism. Also left unanswered is a question about Mukhayriq's conversion to Islam.  According to Omid Safi, Ibn Ishaq, who wrote the biography of the prophet, was "perhaps deliberately ambiguous on the question whether Mukhayriq formally became Muslim, or whether he was a righteous Jew who had affection for Mohamed." According to Norman A. Stillman, Ibn Ishaq says about Mukhayriq: "He recognized the Apostle of Allah — may Allah bless him and grant him peace — by his description and by what he found in his scholarship. However, he was accustomed to his own religion, and this held him back, until the Battle of Uhud (625) which fell upon the Sabbath."

The Battle of Uhud was fought between a force from the Muslim community of Medina, led by the Islamic prophet Muhammad, and a force led by Abu Sufyan ibn Harb from Mecca on March 19, 625.  This day happened to be Saturday, the seventh day of the Jewish week and a very important day of rest in Judaism that Jews call Shabbat. In spite of the required observance of Shabbat, Mukhayriq decided he had to fight together with Muhammad. He then asked his tribesmen to join the battle too. Some agreed, but others reminded the rabbi about the Sabbath. To that, Mukhayriq answered, "You have no Sabbath," and severely censured his tribesmen for not understanding the hidden meaning of the Sabbath. He commanded that, if he were killed in the battle, all his wealth including date palms should go to Muhammad.  Mukhayriq was killed in the battle. As Muqtedar Khan puts it, Rabbi Mukhayriq became "the first Jewish martyr of Islam."  When a severely wounded Muhammad was told about the heroic death of Mukhayriq, Muhammad said: "He was the best of Jews."

The seven gardens and the other wealth Muhammad inherited from the rabbi were used for the establishment of a waqf, the first ever "charitable endowment of Islam."

Aftermath
In 622 Muhammad and the different tribes that lived in Medina, including Jews of Tha'labah, signed the Constitution of Medina. In accordance with this constitution, all tribes living in Medina entered one nation Ummah and were obligated to help each other, to fight their enemies and each to bear their own expenses.

Two Jewish tribes that were allied with Mecca in the Battle of Uhud were expelled from Medina soon after the battle. Two years later, after another battle, the men from the Jewish tribe of Qurayzah were executed.

Opinions
Muqtedar Khan calls the story of Rabbi Mukhayriq's sacrifice "fantastic". Khan believes that if this story about a Jew who was "a true Islamic hero" would have been told more often, "it would contribute to manifestations of increased tolerance by Muslims toward others." Khan continues: "There are many such wonderful examples of brotherhood, tolerance, sacrifice and good citizenship in Islamic traditions that undergird the backbone of Islamic ethics."

References

Muhammad and Judaism
People from Medina
7th-century rabbis
7th-century Arabian Jews